Valle de Santiago is a municipio (municipality) in the Mexican state of Guanajuato, and also the name of its largest township and cabecera municipal (municipal seat).

History

The settlement was founded in 1607 by Pedro Martínez Rincón, Pedro Rivera, Diego Tamayo, Francisco Gómez, Francisco Santoyo, Silvestre de Aguirre, Luis Fonseca, Antonio Estrada, Andrés Cuéllar and Juan Martínez.   

As of the 2010 census, the city had a population of 68,058 (the ninth-largest community in the state), while the municipality had a population of 141,058.

Volcanic Craters 

Over 30 inactive volcanic craters are located in Valle de Santiago, but only 7 of those are recognized, and protected as they have been declared a national monument. The seven volcanic craters are known as Siete Luminarias and include Cíntora, Hoyas de Santa Rosa, La Alberca, San Nicolás de Parangueo, Blanca, Estrada, Álvarez and Solís. Many of these craters naturally evolved into crater-lakes, and they would later become recreational spots. La Alberca, which translates to "the pool", was once an abundant lake that just over 40 years ago was filled with fresh water, but due to human activity has now dried up and been populated with cacti and shrubs. One of the biggest factors for the current state of these now dried crater lakes is the over extraction of groundwater for both water supply and irrigation.  The government has banned groundwater extraction and they are making various efforts to conserve the condition of these seven craters and prevent further damage. Since the SIete Luminares are essential for agriculture and wildlife, there is a large amount of effort being pushed towards their preservation.

References 

 https://www.webcitation.org/5msVc9rGy?url=http://www.inegi.gob.mx/est/contenidos/espanol/sistemas/conteo2005/localidad/iter/ Link to tables of population data from Census of 2005] INEGI: National Institute of Statistics, Geography and Informatics
 Guanajuato Encyclopedia of the Municipalities of Mexico

External links 
 Valle de Santiago Official municipal government website
 El Pais de la Siete Luminarias Valle de Santiago The first website on the Internet

Populated places in Guanajuato
Municipalities of Guanajuato
Populated places established in 1607